Weyburn was a federal electoral district in Saskatchewan, Canada, that was represented in the House of Commons of Canada from 1917 to 1949.

This riding was created in 1914 from parts of Assiniboia, Qu'Appelle and Regina ridings

It was Tommy Douglas' riding from 1935 until he left Parliament to enter provincial politics in 1944.

It was abolished in 1947 when it was redistributed into Moose Mountain, Assiniboia and Qu'Appelle  ridings.

Election results

|-
 
|United Reform
|HILTON, John Harrison  ||align=right|269

See also 

 List of Canadian federal electoral districts
 Past Canadian electoral districts

External links 

Former federal electoral districts of Saskatchewan